Psych may refer to:

Mind
 Psychology 
 psychologist
 Psychiatry
 psychiatrist
 Psychoanalysis
 psychoanalyst
 AP Psych, a U.S. educational exam and course
 IB Psych, an educational course for international baccalaureate
 motivation (to psych up)
 intimidation (to psych out)
 Psych (journal), an academic journal
 Psych ops, in warfare
 American Psychiatric Association (Psych.org)
 College of Psychologists of Ontario (C. Psych.)

Television
 Psych (2006-2014), a U.S. TV show
 Psych: The Musical, a 2013 TV episode
 Psych: The Movie, a 2017 U.S. telefilm
 Psych 2: Lassie Come Home, a 2020 U.S. telefilm
 Psych 3: This Is Gus, a 2021 U.S. telefilm
 Psych (Medium), a 2009 TV episode of Medium

Other uses
 Psychic bid, also called "psych", a play in the contract bridge card game

See also

 
 Psych 9, a 2010 horror film
 PsychOpen, a European open-access publisher
 PubPsych, an open-access retrieval system
 Psy (disambiguation)
 Psyche (disambiguation)
 Psychic (disambiguation)
 Psychedelic (disambiguation)
 Psycho_(disambiguation)
 Shrink (disambiguation)